Cram is an American game show which aired on Game Show Network in 2003. The show featured two teams, each composed of two contestants. For 24 hours before taping, the contestants were sequestered, sleep deprived at a storefront (located at the then named Kodak Theatre on Hollywood Boulevard, which is now called the Dolby Theatre). Contestants were then escorted to Sony Pictures Studios, in Culver City, California, where the actual gameplay would commence; with the intent of the contestants staying awake, and "cramming" various material such as trivia questions and jokes, which they would then answer on the show while attempting physical stunts in an attempt to stay awake. Graham Elwood was the show's host, with assistance from Berglind Icey, Arturo Gil, and Andrea Hutchman.

Format

The Rant
Two teams, each with two members each, forming a pre-existing relationship, are introduced to the audience. To start, both teams were given a default consolation of 100 points. Round one consisted of The Rant. Each team was required to talk about one of three articles, (two in the second season) they had been assigned to read, while exercising inside a giant hamster wheel.

The team who won a "3 a.m. coin toss", that was done before the show, selected one of the article topics to Rant about, while the other team picked from the remaining choice(s). (Which season two featured only two articles, and the other team automatically, were tasked with the other article topic). Each team had to talk continuously for 40 seconds, (which each team member respectively talking for 20 seconds) basically trying their best to memorize verbatim, and word for word, the article they have chosen, that they were indubitably presented with, and hopefully read to study before, with the main goal of having the contestant incidentally say a preselected highlighted key word from a list which the producers have previously chosen. (This list is shown to home viewers, but not the contestants.)

If a contestant stopped talking, was stalling, and was being mute for more than a second, if a contestant stuttered or stammered with their speech, or if a contestant was going off-topic at any point, the team was penalized five points per violation.

If a team said one of the eight hidden key words or phrases related to the article, ten points were added to their score. Which if teams are able to concoct more words from the list, points are added. Which also in turn, penalties were strictly immediately enforced, complimented, and followed by a loud buzzer, intending to further disrupt a player from ranting. After the first team Ranted, the second team attempted their Rant. However, both teams had to continually walk inside the wheels during both Rants.

In many cases, due to the haphazardness of this round, after a team rants, Elwood would enact and explain technicalities the judges gave, either negatively (if a team said a key word incompletely, or slightly mispronounced a key word, misspoke a key word, or said a version of a key word, the judges felt was unsatisfactory, or if a team  committed a penalty that wasn't accounted for yet, points will be deducted.) or positively. (if a pluralized, past or future tense form of a key word is said, acceptable by the judges, or in select occasions if a team is incorrectly penalized, teams are credited points.)

Early episodes of the first season saw the Rant work slightly different. Each player had 30 seconds to talk continuously about the article (60 seconds total); with ten hidden key words or phrases selected from the article. 1 point was added per second for Ranting up to 60, while the points added for saying a keyword or deducted for committing a violation remained the same.

Stunt round
For round two, each team (starting with the team in the lead or the winners of the 3 a.m. coin toss in case of a tie) performed a stunt and answered a list of questions for 40 seconds (45 seconds in the first season). The team that was in the lead (or if teams were tied, the 3 a.m. coin toss winners) were allowed to choose one of two stunts, that they must participate in. (which in season one, teams chose between stunts, that were hidden under covered dinner plates, and were completely by chance. In season two, stunts are shown upfront, and contestants chose the task strictly, loosely related on a book or magazine they were told to study. The actual components of the task are still unknown to the teams.) The round tested the teams' ability  to multitask after being deprived of sleep. Stunts took various forms, such as demonstrating yoga positions, matching cuts of meat to a picture of a cow, or even firing hard candies at small chocolate bunnies using a slingshot. All of the aspects of the stunts, were things that the contestants had been given to study overnight. Every stunt had seven physical items, tasks, or activities the teams were asked to do. Once each team was done with a task, Elwood would then mediate scoring and judging. Each successful part of the stunt won 20 points for the team. The other team would automatically perform the second activity, with the format being identical as far as scoring. During the stunt, in some cases, teams may be allowed to change their mind on an answer, as long as this is done before time is over. When judging the challenge afterwards, only the answer given while time was elapsing would be considered.

In many cases with challenges featuring teams to emote, give gestures, and perform and give sign or body language, a freeze frame shot, of the contestant, will be shown with another freeze frame shot of Elwood or Icey, giving the correct answer, according to the judges, in which contestants were expected to be exact. In several cases, if a contestant was close enough to the gesture, signal or motion, teams were added points.

While the partners alternated playing the stunt, they also alternated answering a list of instant trivia questions read by Elwood. The questions consisted of an unrelated trivial list, that contestants were also asked to study prior. After Elwood read the item, the partner had to give the relevant answer to score 10 points. Both parts of the round happened at the same time and never stopped, so one contestant might be assuming a yoga position and answering a question simultaneously if both their turns came up at the same time. Each list consisted of 12 questions; if the team completed the entire list, they would continue doing the stunt until time ran out. Although the questions were not mandatory to answer, and a team could pass, and Elwood would give the next rotated question on the list, without any direct penalty, correct responses from the instant trivia questions were probably beneficial, and were respectfully and instantly added to a team's score, along with the stunt score, which was always judged later.

At any time, the team not participating in the stunt had to continue walking inside their hamster wheel.

Riddle round
After the stunt round, both teams had one last chance to add to their points. Starting with the trailing team, one partner, being the activity partner, would participate in an activity, to compensate allowing their team member, the question answering partner, to answer. This challenge varied greatly, and would either be an endurance task, in which the activity team member had to power a mechanism to a set level or speed, or a mental task, in which the activity team member would be consuming, or eating something. The question answering partner, had 40 seconds (45 seconds in the first season) to answer inane trivia questions, which the contestants were told to study prior, (varying from riddles, puns, jokes, compound words, or alternative media franchise titles) posed by Elwood, each worth 30 points. Before he/she could answer, however, the activity partner had to reach and maintain a certain threshold, or rule according to challenge, to allow the question answering partner to speak. Every passed, or missed question given by the question answering partner, increased the difficulty. (usually making the activity partner finish, or complete additional repetitions or amounts.)

In some episodes, if an activity partner was doing an endurance task, operating a mechanism, a projection screen was displayed behind the contestants, which featured a front POV video recording, of a person driving a Saturn Ion, throughout the streets of Los Angeles. This was merely cosmetic, and incidental.

If the round involved a table of lemon juice shots that the activity partner had to drink, an evil dwarf named "Dr. Damnearkilter" (Arturo Gil) appeared to constantly heckle the activity partner by whipping the table and shouting stuff like "DRINK IT!", "DRINK IT DOWN!", "SCHNELL! SCHNELL!!" and "PURE ACID!" into the activity partner's face.

At the end of this round, the higher-scoring team won $1,000 and advanced to the bonus round, while their opponents won $500. If the game ended in a tie, a question with a numerical answer was asked; both teams wrote down a guess, and the team that came closest was the winner. Each team's winnings were split evenly between the two partners.

$10,000 quiz
For the $10,000 quiz bonus round, immediately after the stunt round, the winning team, climbed into a pair of twin beds onstage and donned blindfolds while the lights were dimmed. "Miss Pickwick," the "resident sleep therapist" (Andrea Hutchman), would read the team a series of bizarre facts, historical events, and other strange pieces of trivia. In addition to the facts, contestants were also read various suggestions such as "You're getting so sleepy" to make staying awake even more difficult. When the show came back from the break, the team's memory, would be tested on the facts Miss Pickwick had just read to them.

The complete information given by Miss Pickwick in every episode, is unknown, as home viewers are given incomplete excerpts of her talking. Miss Pickwick gives an array of information, before she is instantly cut off by the program, (in several cases, when she is mid sentence) when a post production commercial break is held. (Although in actuality, there is not a break for the in studio production.) When the program returns from break, Miss Pickwick is continuing (usually mid sentence) giving facts, although information she may have said interim, is unknown. (This is further complicated, when returning from the commercial break Elwood whispers the aforementioned quiz rules to the audience, while Miss Pickwick is audibly, continuing to give contestants, more information.)

At this time, with the studio lights still dim, and Miss Pickwick still talking; Elwood, silently explains the rules. Elwood will ask questions to the contestants, based on the identical information, Miss Pickwick is concurrently explaining to them. However, before contestants can answer a question, they have to get all four feet off the ground and onto a very uncomfortable object, (which varied greatly, and no rhyme or reason for the object being selected was given. It was pure, random chance, to the object the team was faced with; from a small flat raised circle stump on the ground, a balance beam, a rolling log, a high wire, or two raised balance levers) that was located in the center of the stage. Every time a player's foot or any part of their body touched the ground, a buzzer sounded and Elwood would stop reading and start the question again from the beginning. (Players could respond and answer Elwood immediately, at any time their feet were off the ground, without waiting for him to finish the question.) The contestants must consecutively answer five questions (and get to Level 5) correctly. (Or in the very least, keep a consecutive steady level streak, which if reset, contestants must start over to five). Giving an incorrect answer or passing, moved the team down a level, and they must recover their question streak, with the objective still to reach five levels.

After Elwood is finished explaining the rules. The studio lights were turned on in time with a loud alarm, often accompanied by Icey making a loud noise such as banging trash can lids, running a chainsaw, or playing an electric guitar at full volume. A 60-second countdown immediately started, and the team had to get out of bed and run across the stage to Elwood, standing on the uncomfortable object, following the as promised format, Elwood just explained previously.

If the team reached Level 5 before time ran out, they split $10,000; if not, they split $100 for each level they had reached (e.g. Level 3 – $300), in addition to their $1000 they received for being the winning team of the episode. If a team did not manage to get a single answer correct, (or they gave correct answer(s), but also gave incorrect answers or passes in the process, so therefore, their streak was reset) they simply kept their $1000. Cram souvenir coffee mugs were given to $10,000 winners in the first season, and to all game-winning teams in the second season.

April Fools' Day episode
The 2003 April Fool's Day episode, as part of GSN's April Fools prank where hosts swap places, in which the original hosts appear as cameos, and play as contestants in Lingo for charity, was hosted by Marc Summers, the host of WinTuition, and featured Elwood in drag as Miss Pickwick. Elwood was also featured in the POV video during round 3, appearing to be running from a vehicle trying to run him down.

Broadcast history
GSN would air Cram in first run on Sunday nights, with reruns being shown sporadically through the networks time slot. The show vanished off airplay for quite some time. As of 2020, Pluto TV, has episodes of the show, available for streaming.

References

Game Show Network original programming
2000s American game shows
Television shows set in Los Angeles
2003 American television series debuts
2003 American television series endings
Television series by Jonathan Goodson Productions